Hansonville may refer to:
 Hansonville, Victoria, Australia
 Rackerby, California, formerly Hansonville
 Hansonville Township, Lincoln County, Minnesota
 Hansonville, Virginia, United States
 Hansonville, Alberta, Canada